Penn is an unincorporated community and former railway station in Lane County, in the U.S. state of Oregon. It was named for the Penn Timber Company, which operated in the vicinity.

Wildcat Creek, a tributary of the Siuslaw River, flows by Penn.

The name of the post office for Penn was McGlynn. Postal officials rejected Penn as the name for the office because it might be confused with other entities. They approved McGlynn, named after Thomas McGlynn, who owned the land where the post office was established. The McGlynn post office opened in 1923 and closed in 1938.

References

Unincorporated communities in Lane County, Oregon
Unincorporated communities in Oregon